Etienne De Wilde (born 23 March 1958 in Wetteren, East Flanders) is a Belgian former professional road bicycle racer. De Wilde won races on the road and on the track. He won a silver medal in the madison at the 2000 Summer Olympics.

Major results

1979
 3rd National Amateur Road Race Championships
1980
 1st Stage 12 Vuelta a España
 1st Grand Prix d'Isbergues
 1st Berlare & Nevele
 5th Blois-Chaville
1981
 1st Omloop van West-Brabant
 1st Stage 1a Three Days of De Panne
 1st Velaines sur Sambre & Wetteren
1982
 1st Flèche Picarde
 1st Stage 2 Four Days of Dunkirk
 1st Stage 3 Tour de l'Oise
 1st Mouscron, Wetteren & Zele
1983
 1st Dwars door Vlaanderen
 1st Flèche Picarde
 1st Stage 3 Tour de l'Oise
 1st Destelbergen, Laarne & Sint-Niklaas
 5th Gent–Wevelgem
1984
 1st Omloop van de Fruitstreken
1985
 1st Stage 1 Setmana Catalana de Ciclisme
 1st Temse
1986
 1st  Omnium, National Track Championships
 1st Stage 2 Tour de l'Aude
 1st Merelbeke
 3rd National Road Race Championships
1987
 1st Scheldeprijs
 1st Nokere Koerse
 1st Boucles Parisiennes
 1st Stage 2 Tour de l'Oise
 1st Hasselt & Ninove
 2nd  European madison championship (with Stan Tourné)
 2nd Gent–Wevelgem
1988
 1st  National Road Race Championships
 1st   Omnium, National Track Championships
 1st GP Wielerrevue
 1st Stage 4 Paris–Nice
 1st Stage 2 Tour Méditerranéen
 1st Stage 1 Three Days of De Panne
 1st Prologue Tour of Belgium
 1st Beveren-Leie, Sint-Katelijne-Waver & Scherpenheuvel
1989
  Omnium, European Track Championships
 1st Overall Étoile de Bessèges
1st Stages 1, 3 & 4
 1st Omloop Het Volk
 1st Kampioenschap van Vlaanderen
 1st Stage 7 Tour de France
 1st Stages 1 & 2 Paris–Nice
 1st Stages 3a & 6 La Méditerranéenne
 1st Stage 4 Tour d'Armorique
 1st Aalst, Geraardsbergen, Herselt, Laarne and 's Heerenhoek
 4th Wincanton Classic
1990
 1st Grand Prix d'Ouverture La Marseillaise
 1st Omloop van de Fruitstreken
 1st Stage 2 Paris–Nice
 1st Stage 3 Tour Méditerranéen
 1st Stage 1 Tour of Belgium
1991
 1st GP Wielerrevue
 1st Stage 3 Tour de France
 1st Ronse
1993
 World Points Race Champion
 1st Wetteren
1994
 1st Omloop van het Houtland
 1st Coca Cola Trophy
 1st Ennepetal
 2nd Points race, National Track Championships
1995
 1st Wetteren
  European Madison Championship (with Lorenzo Lapage)
1997
 1st Rodenkirchen
  European Madison Championship (with Frank Corvers)
1998
 1st  Madison (with Matthew Gilmore), UCI Track World Championships
 1st Omloop van het Houtland
 1st Dentergem & Stekene
1999
 1st Grote Prijs Stad Zottegem
 1st Omloop van het Houtland
 1st Deurne
2000
  European Madison Champion (with Matthew Gilmore)
  Olympic Games - Men's Madison (with Matthew Gilmore)
2001
  European Madison Champion (with Matthew Gilmore)

Six Days-wins

1983
 Six Days of Ghent (with René Pijnen)
1985
 Six Days of Ghent (with Stan Tourné)
 Six Days of Paris (with Stan Tourné)
1987
 Six Days of Ghent (with Danny Clark)
 Six Days of Antwerp (with Danny Clark)
1988
 Six Days of Köln (with Stan Tourné)
 Six Days of Antwerp (with Stan Tourné)
1989
 Six Days of Paris (with Charly Mottet)
 Six Days of Dortmund (with Andreas Kappes)
 Six Days of Munich (with Andreas Kappes)
 Six Days of Ghent (with Stan Tourné)
1990
 Six Days of Bordeaux (with Gilbert Duclos-Lassalle)
 Six Days of Köln (with Andreas Kappes)
 Six Days of Stuttgart (with Volker Diehl)
 Six Days of Anvers (with Eric Vanderaerden)
1991
 Six Days of Bremen (with Andreas Kappes)
 Six Days of Ghent (with Tony Doyle)
 Six Days of Köln (with Andreas Kappes)
 Six Days of Stuttgart (with Andreas Kappes)
 Six Days of Antwerp (with Rudy Dhaenens)
1992
 Six Days of Bremen (with Andreas Kappes)
 Six Days of Ghent (with Jens Veggerby)
1993
 Six Days of Antwerp (with Kostantine Khrabzov)
 Six Days of Stuttgart (with Andreas Kappes)
1994
 Six Days of Antwerp (with Jens Veggerby)
 Six Days of Ghent (with Danny Clark)
 Six Days of Stuttgart (with Jens Veggerby)
1995
 Six Days of Bordeaux (with Frédéric Magné)
 Six Days of Ghent (with Andreas Kappes)
 Six Days of Munich (with Erik Zabel)
 Six Days of Stuttgart (with Danny Clark)
1997
 Six Days of Ghent (with Matthew Gilmore)
 Six Days of Köln (with Olaf Ludwig)
1998
 Six Days of Leipzig (with Andreas Kappes)
 Six Days of Milan (with Silvio Martinello)
1999
 Six Days of Berlin (with Andreas Kappes)

External links 

Official Tour de France results for Etienne De Wilde

1958 births
Living people
People from Wetteren
Belgian male cyclists
Belgian Tour de France stage winners
Belgian Vuelta a España stage winners
Olympic cyclists of Belgium
Cyclists at the 1996 Summer Olympics
Cyclists at the 2000 Summer Olympics
Olympic silver medalists for Belgium
Olympic medalists in cycling
UCI Track Cycling World Champions (men)
Cyclists from East Flanders
Medalists at the 2000 Summer Olympics
Belgian track cyclists
20th-century Belgian people
21st-century Belgian people